Jack Lee Ging (November 30, 1931 – September 9, 2022) was an American actor. He was best known as General Harlan "Bull" Fulbright on NBC's television adventure series The A-Team, and for his supporting role in the final season of Tales of Wells Fargo starring Dale Robertson.

Early life
Born on November 30, 1931, Ging was the son of a couple who farmed on the outskirts of Alva, Oklahoma. Both sets of his grandparents were participants in the Cherokee Strip Land Run of 1893. When he was young, his parents divorced, and his mother began working as a "Harvey Girl". Although his mother had custody of him, her irregular hours as a waitress led to his living with relatives. Eventually, he settled with a family named Domenici while he attended a Catholic school. Later, he attended St. Michael's boarding school in Santa Fe, New Mexico. He left there when his mother became ill, resulting in their return to Oklahoma, where she lived with his grandmother while he lived with an aunt and uncle.

Before turning to acting, Ging served in the United States Marine Corps for four years and was honorably discharged. During the 1950s, he played college football at the University of Oklahoma, Norman. He scored five touchdowns during his time at Oklahoma and played in the 1954 Orange Bowl game.

Career
Ging starred in the war film Sniper's Ridge (1961) and played Will Coleman in Where the Red Fern Grows (1974). Other film credits include Hang 'Em High (1968), Play Misty for Me (1971), and High Plains Drifter (1973), all opposite Clint Eastwood. He also appeared in the horror films Die Sister, Die! (1972) and Sssssss (1973), as well as the action film That Man Bolt (1973). He appeared in TV movies such as Terror in the Sky (1971) and The Disappearance of Flight 412 (1974).

Ging portrayed Dan Wright in NBC's The Man and the Challenge (1959–1960). He also starred in "Dead Men don't pay no debts", an episode of Bat Masterson, playing a small-town sheriff in love with a girl whose name is the same as the man he's sworn to kill. He portrayed a raider in eight episodes of the 1958–1959 syndicated western series Mackenzie's Raiders. Thereafter, he appeared as Beau McCloud in thirteen episodes in the last season of the ABC western series Tales of Wells Fargo.

In 1960, Ging appeared in one episode of The Twilight Zone, "The Whole Truth". He made three guest appearances on Perry Mason, including, in 1962, playing Danny Pierce in "The Case of the Lonely Eloper". From 1962 to 1964, he played a young psychiatrist in NBC's 62-episode medical drama The Eleventh Hour. In 1966 he played "Simon Dobbs", a blind ex-lawman trying to cope with his new affliction, on the episode "Stage Stop" (S12E10) on the TV Western Gunsmoke.

Ging had a recurring role as Lieutenant Dan Ives, one of many of Joe Mannix's Los Angeles Police Department contacts on Mannix from 1967 to 1975. Ging's other roles were on The Roaring 20s, The Six Million Dollar Man, The Bionic Woman, Wiseguy, B. J. and the Bear, The Winds of War, and War and Remembrance. In 1981, Ging played Tracy Winslow in the episode "My Heroes Have Always Been Cowboys" of ABC's The Greatest American Hero. From 1984 to 1985, Ging played the arrogant Lieutenant Ted Quinlan on the adventure/detective series Riptide; his character was killed off and he went on to appear on The A-Team, on which he made two guest appearances as villains. His roles as a regular on TV programs included that of Chuck Morris on the short-lived CBS crime drama Dear Detective and Admiral Conte on the NBC adventure series The Highwayman.

Athletic accomplishments
In addition to his achievements in football during his college years, Ging played for one season with the Edmonton Eskimos of the Canadian Football League after he graduated. He also was a "Crosby golf tournament winner, [and a] Clint Eastwood Celebrity Tennis tournament champion."

Personal life
Jack and Katie Ging married "right out of high school". After they divorced, he wed Gretchen Graening on April 19, 1956. They had one son and divorced in September 1973. On September 23, 1978, Ging married Sharon Ramona Thompson in Los Angeles. They had two daughters. 

Ging died of natural causes at his home in La Quinta, California, on September 9, 2022, at the age of 90.

Filmography

Film

Television

References

External links
 
 

1931 births
2022 deaths
Male actors from Oklahoma
Military personnel from Oklahoma
American male film actors
American male television actors
20th-century American male actors
People from Alva, Oklahoma
People from Greater Los Angeles
United States Marines
Oklahoma Sooners football players
Western (genre) television actors